The Love Train is the second EP by American singer-songwriter Meghan Trainor. It was released on February 8, 2019 by Epic Records. All of the material on the EP was produced by Andrew Wells, Chris Gelbuda, Tyler Johnson and Trainor. Critics described the lyrics as romantic as they were inspired by Trainor's marriage to Daryl Sabara.

"All the Ways" was released as a single on February 11, 2019. Trainor described the EP as a predecessor to her then upcoming third major-label studio album, Treat Myself. It peaked at number 10 on the US Digital Albums chart and number 37 on Top Album Sales. Trainor promoted it with several music videos for other songs on the EP. Epic reissued it with three additional tracks on February 12, 2021, with an AJ Mitchell duet of the track "After You" which was previously released on Treat Myself.

Background and composition
Meghan Trainor initially announced that her third major-label studio album, Treat Myself, would be released on August 31, 2018. However, it was delayed to January 25, 2019, and removed from iTunes that month. On February 4, 2019, Trainor announced the release of an EP, called The Love Train, which she described as a teaser for Treat Myself. The Love Train was inspired by Trainor's marriage with Daryl Sabara. Epic reissued the EP on February 12, 2021, with Thank You (2016) Target edition songs "Throwback Love" and "Goosebumps" being added as bonus tracks, and an AJ Mitchell duet of the track "After You" replacing the solo version.

The opener and lead single, "All the Ways" is a love song, inspired by the work of ABBA. Mike Wass of Idolator described the song as having "cute synths" and a "pure-pop sensibility." "Marry Me" is a ukelele-driven song about Trainor's desire to make things official with her significant other. Trainor said that she wrote the song in a hotel room with Sabara. "I'm Down" has been described as a "dancefloor" anthem with a "big" chorus. "After You" is a piano ballad that sees the singer pleading for her lover to stay by her side. Wass described "Foolish" as having "frantic beats"; lyrics include "They say that fools rush in. But I, oh I, I wanna be foolish with you". "Good Mornin'" is an "atmospheric" song featuring Trainor's father playing the organ.

Promotion
Several music videos were released to promote The Love Train, one per day during a week. On February 10, 2019, a music video for "I'm Down" was uploaded to Trainor's YouTube account. One day later, the music video for "Foolish" was released. It was edited by her brother Ryan Trainor and features footage from Meghan and Sabara's wedding reception. On February 12, the music video for "After You", directed by Charm La'Donna, was released. It features dancers Kaycee Rice and Sean Lew. On the following day, the music video for "Good Mornin'" was released. It was directed by Baxter Stapleton and also featured two dancers. On February 14, the music video for "Marry Me" was released. Created by Toon53 Productions, it also featured Trainor's wedding footage. One day later, the music video for "All the Ways" was released. Directed by Brian Petchers, it stars Bailee Madison. The Love Train was also promoted through a press release, which drew controversy because of its "graphic nature and bizarre phrasing", with sexually ambiguous terms such as "wet", "junk" and "bangin'" being used.

"All the Ways", which was initially released as a promotional single for Treat Myself on June 20, 2018, was serviced to hot adult contemporary radio as the lead single from the EP on February 11, 2019. Described as "fun" and "danceable" by Billboard, the song was used in a 2018 Target marketing campaign. It peaked at number 16 on the US Adult Top 40 chart.

Reception
The Love Train peaked at number 10 on the US Digital Albums chart and number 37 on Top Album Sales.

Idolator's Mike Wass described the EP as "overflowing with lush production and endearing sentiment" and "a major success." Writing for BroadwayWorld, Danielle Taylor was positive about the EP, and stated "the production on these tracks are (sic) fantastic and will hold us over until Trainor's next studio album is released". Radio.com's Kyle McCann wrote that the EP "gives fans a few bops to vibe to", and added "we're feelin' each of the six songs".

In a mixed review, Stephen Thomas Erlewine of AllMusic called The Love Train a "breezy stopgap EP", further describing it as a "celebration of romance" coming from Trainor, "who had reason to extol the virtues of love". He added that the press release was "ridiculously overheated" and "carnal," also stating that the EP is "heavy on soaring ballads and persistent dance-pop that don't quite fit into the trends of the late 2010s."

Track listing

Notes
 All track titles are stylized in all caps.

Credits and personnel
Credits are referenced from the EP's liner notes:

 Meghan Trainorsongwriting, lead vocals, production, percussion
 Andrew Wellssongwriting, production, engineering, bass, guitar, synthesizer
 Jacob Kasher Hindlinsongwriting
 Chris Gelbudaproduction, acoustic guitar, engineering, ukulele
 Tyler Johnsonsongwriting, production, keyboards, piano, recording
 Joshua Kearsongwriting
 Anders Mouridsensongwriting, guitar, piano
 Gamal Lewissongwriting
 Daryl Sabarasongwriting, percussion
 John Hanesengineering
 Bo Bodnarengineering, percussion
 Randy Merrillmastering
 Şerban Gheneamixing
 John Whitt, Jr.synthesizer
 Mitch McCarthymixing
 Greg Magersrecording
 Rob Humphriesdrums
 Dan Higginssaxophone
 Drew Taubenfeldguitar
 Gary Trainororgan, percussion, piano
 Ryan Trainorpercussion
 Kelli Trainorpercussion
 Kameron Alexanderpercussion

Charts

Release history

References

2019 EPs
Meghan Trainor albums
Epic Records EPs